Manuel José Estrada Cabrera (21 November 1857 – 24 September 1924) was the President of Guatemala from 1898 to 1920. A lawyer with no military background, he was a dictator who modernised the country's industry and transportation infrastructure, but only via granting concessions to the American-owned United Fruit Company, whose influence on the government was deeply unpopular among the population. Estrada Cabrera used increasingly brutal methods to assert his authority, including armed strike-breaking, and he effectively controlled the general elections. He retained power for 22 years through controlled elections in 1904, 1910, and 1916, and was eventually removed from office when the national assembly declared him mentally incompetent, and he was jailed for corruption.

Background 

Estrada Cabrera was a lawyer. He studied at the Universidad Nacional and thanks to his work he reached the position of "First Designated for the Presidency" when José María Reina Barrios was elected to his second term as president. He was also the Secretary of Interior for most of Reyna Barrios regime.  When the Reyna Barrios cabinet members were announced in 1892, a newspaper article that accompanied the images said: "Manuel Estrada Cabrera, who is this gentleman?" By 1920, when Estrada Cabrera was finally deposed, the writer got his answer.

Interim President (1898) 

After the assassination of Reina Barrios on February 8, 1898, the Guatemalan cabinet called an emergency meeting to appoint a new successor, but declined to invite Estrada Cabrera to the meeting, even though he was the First Designated to the Presidency.  There are two versions on how he was able to get the Presidency: (a) Estrada Cabrera entered "with pistol drawn" to assert his entitlement to the presidency  and (b) Estrada Cabrera showed up to the meeting and demanded to be given the presidency as he was the First Designated".

The first Guatemalan head of state from civilian life in over 50 years, Estrada Cabrera overcame resistance to his regime by August 1898 and called for September elections, which he won handily. At that time, Estrada Cabrera was 44 years old; he was stocky, of medium height, and broad-shouldered. The mustache gave him a plebeian appearance. Black and dark eyes, metallic sounding voice and was rather sullen and brooding. At the same time, he already showed his courage and character. This was demonstrated on the night of the death of Reina Barrios when he stood in front of the ministers meeting in the government palace to choose a successor, and said: "Gentlemen, let me please sign this decree. As First Designated, you must hand me the Presidency". His first decree was a general amnesty and the second was to reopen all the elementary schools closed by Reyna Barrios, both administrative and political measures aimed at winning over public opinion. Estrada Cabrera was almost unknown in the political circles of the capital and one could not foresee the features of his government or his intentions.

Cabinet 
 Interior and Justice: Francisco Anguiano
 Promotion: Antonio Barrios
 Finance: Rafael Salazar
 Public Instruction: Domingo Morales
 War: Salvador Toledo (replaced after a few months by Gregorio Contreras)
 Head of the Judiciary: José Pinto
 First appointed to the chair: Feliciano Aguilar
 Second appointed to the chair: Felipe Cruz

Call for Elections 

 "(Estrada Cabrera) is a sincere man. He is also a committed man of good will and full of faith. Has strong ideas to fight for and for the sake of which would be sacrificed if necessary. He is a man."
 "His lips form a contrast with his eyes. The eyes always bright, always calm, reveal the inner strength and mastery of his own soul. The lips are kind and sentimental. The forehead is broad and without crease, a studious man forehead which reflects intellectual robustness"

And when the election was getting close:

 "Two months ago, our candidate was a hope; today he is a reality. Two months ago we encouraged confidence in his principles, in his heart and in his talent. Today is his behavior that enhances and strengthens our confidence. So, after having a candidate for the Liberal Party, today we have a candidate for the Homeland. It was what we needed. Tomorrow, finally, every patriot will see to the best liberal patriotism and every nuance is that his liberalism."

In 1898 the legislature convened for the election of President Estrada Cabrera, who triumphed thanks to the large number of soldiers and policemen who went to vote in civilian clothes and to the large number of illiterate family members that they brought with them to the polls. Also, the effective propaganda that was written in the official newspaper "the Liberal Idea ', run by the poet Joaquin Mendez. Among the writers were Enrique Gómez Carrillo,  Rafael Spinola, Máximo Soto Hall and Juan Manuel Mendoza,  and others.

Gómez Carrillo received as a reward for his work as political propagandist an appointment as general consul in Paris, with 250 gold pesos monthly salary, and immediately went back to Europe 

The other candidates were:

 José Luis Castillo de Leon, who had 5 castillistas clubs in the capital and in 70 municipalities, and who was the strongest candidate.
 Francisco Fuentes, who had most of his supporters in Quetzaltenango.
 Feliz Morales, former Minister of Reyna Barrios.

First term: United Fruit Company 

One of Estrada Cabrera's most famous and most bitter legacies was the entry of the United Fruit Company into the Guatemalan economical and political arena. As a member of the Liberal Party, he sought to encourage development of the nation's infrastructure of highways, railroads, and sea ports for the sake of expanding the export economy. When Estrada Cabrera assumed the presidency, there had been repeated efforts to construct a railroad from the major port of Puerto Barrios to the capital, Guatemala City. Yet, due to lack of funding exacerbated by the collapse of the internal coffee industry, the railway fell sixty miles short of its goal. Estrada Cabrera decided, without consulting the legislature or judiciary, that striking a deal with the United Fruit Company was the only way to finish the railway. Cabrera signed a contract with UFC's Minor Cooper Keith in 1904 that gave the company tax-exemptions, land grants, and control of all railroads on the Atlantic side.

Estrada Cabrera often employed brutal methods to assert his authority, as was the fashion in Guatemala at the time. Like him, presidents Rafael Carrera y Turcios and Justo Rufino Barrios had led tyrannical governments in the country. Right at the beginning of his first presidential period, he started prosecuting his political rivals and soon established a well-organized web of spies.

One American Minister returned to the United States after he learned the dictator had given orders to poison him. Former President Manuel Barillas was stabbed to death in Mexico City, on a street outside of the Mexican presidential residence on Cabrera's orders; the street now bears the name of Calle Guatemala. Also, Estrada Cabrera responded violently to workers' strikes against UFC. In one incident, when UFC went directly to Estrada Cabrera to resolve a strike (after the armed forces refused to respond), the president ordered an armed unit to enter the workers' compound. The forces "arrived in the night, firing indiscriminately into the workers' sleeping quarters, wounding and killing an unspecified number."

In 1906 Estrada faced serious revolts against his rule; the rebels were supported by the governments of some of the other Central American nations, but Estrada succeeded in putting them down. Elections were held by the people against the will of Estrada Cabrera and thus he had the president-elect murdered in retaliation.

Second term (1905–1911)

Presidential elections were held on August 7, 1904 and Estrada Cabrera was again the winner. In December 1908 there was a measles epidemic all over the country, but it was efficiently controlled by the doctors of his regime.

Cabinet members:

 Infrastructure Secretary: Joaquín Méndez
 War Secretary: Luis Molina
 Secretary of Foreign Relations: Juan Barrios M.
 Secretary of the Interior: José María Reina Andrade
 Secretary of Education: Angel M. Bocanegra
 National Assembly:
 President: Arturo Ubico Urruela
 Secretary: José A. Beteta
 Secretary: Francisco C. Castañeda
 Cotzumalguapa representative: Carlos Herrera
 Flores, Petén representative: Adrián Vidaurre, who would also serve as War Auditor.
 United States Ambassadors:
 Joseph W. J. Lee (19 March 1907 – 17 January 1908)
 General George W. Davis (17 January 1908 – 9 October 1909)
 Willam F. Sands (9 October 1909 – 1 October 1910)
 Robert Stockton Renolds Hitt (1 October 1910 – 1911)

"The Bomb" assassination attempt 

In early 1907, lawyer Enrique Ávila Echeverría and his brother, physician Jorge Ávila Echeverría, along with Dr. Julio Valdés Blanco and electrical engineer Baltasar Rodil, planned a bombing attack on the president of Guatemala, Estrada Cabrera, which took place on April 29, 1907 and is generally known in Guatemala as "The Bomb". The Echeverría brothers and their confederates were members of the elite class and had studied abroad, but when they returned to Guatemala, they objected to the government's extreme abuse of power and determined on assassinating the president. They decided on explosives. They prepared everything meticulously: the explosives, the detonators, the day and the exact time; even the president's driver—Patrocinio Monterroso—was part of the conspiracy.

On the day planned for the attack, April 29, the president was traveling in the capital in his chariot along with his 13-year-old son, Joaquin, and his Chief of Staff, general José María Orellana. Around 10 a.m., the president and his retinue were traveling on 7th S. Avenue, between the 16th and 17th W streets when the bomb detonated. The explosion failed to injure Estrada Cabrera or those that were with him. Only the driver and one of the horses died.

On May 2, 1907 Emilio Ubico, brother of Arturo Ubico Urruela—president of Congress—and uncle of Jorge Ubico Castañeda—political chief of Verapaz, was appointed Chief of Police, in charge of the investigations, along the Secretary of the Interior, Reina Andrade. A few days later, Congress issued Decree 737, by which any explosive-related import was prohibited, unless previously authorized by the Secretary of War.

Over the next twenty-two days, the four conspirators fled through the small streets and little holes that they could find, trying to escape from Guatemala City, but the government surrounded the city and slowly tightened the perimeter while combing every inch of terrain. The conspirators' families were incarcerated and prosecuted. Others conspirators, brothers Juan and Adolfo Viteri and Francisco Valladares, were arrested when they attempted to flee disguised as women in Guastatoya. Others, like Felipe and Rafael Prado Romaña, tried to flee to El Salvador, but were captured when someone informed on them. The Romaña brothers remained imprisoned until their death. Only the Colombian Rafael Madriñán escaped the country on a bicycle. The mother of the Romaña brothers took the Mexican Ambassador, Federico Camboa, to the house where the Avila Echeverría brothers and his friends were hiding, who, knowing that they had only days to live, gave him all their valuables and begged him to pass them on to their relatives.

At last, after several days of uncertainty, Rufina Roca de Monzón gave them shelter in the second floor of her home, # 29 Judío Place in Guatemala City, but a spy learned about it.  On May 20, 1907, at 3 a.m. the house was surrounded by a platoon of soldiers. The troop broke down the door and tried to reach the second floor, but at that moment gunfight began. By 6 a.m. the conspirators were out of ammo and exhausted and decided to kill themselves before becoming prisoners of the regime. The Diario de Centro América, then a semi-official newspaper owned by Estrada Cabrera, went as far as to publish the conspirators autopsy details.

"The cadets" assassination attempt 

By 1908, Santo Domingo Church members had modified the path of its centennial and traditional Good Friday procession, such that now it passed in front of Estrada Cabrera's house on the 7th S. Avenue in Guatemala City.  That year, several Military Academy cadets, after noticing that the procession uniforms completely covered the face of the penitents, decided to disguise themselves and blend in with the procession and by the time it passed in front of the president's house, they would storm in and take him prisoner. However, the extremely efficient spy system that Estrada Cabrera had in place allowed him to thwart the kidnapping attempt.  As soon as he learned about this, Estrada Cabrera prohibited the procession from passing in front of his house, placed a fence in front of it and prohibited the use of masks for the Holy Week processions.

On April 20, 1908 during the official reception of the new United States Ambassador in the National Palace, Military Academy cadet Víctor Manuel Vega, in revenge for what happened to his classmates and teachers, shot Estrada Cabrera point blank, but only managed to hurt him on his pinky finger.  A flag from the official escort kept the bullet from reaching the president. Enraged, and in order to set a precedent, Estrada Cabrera ordered the shooting death of all Vega's Military Academy unit, except two, Rogelio Girón and Manuel Hurtarte, who were taken prisoners without any legal document.  Vega had died on the spot where he tried to attack the president, killed instantly by his bodyguards. The president also ordered the Military Academy to be closed, its building demolished and that salt would be spread on the field. Several military officers were sent to prison, including some loyal to the president.

Conditions in the Penitentiary were cruel and foul.  Political offenses were tortured daily and their screams could be heard all over the Penitentiary.  Prisoners regularly died under these conditions since political crimes had no pardon.

It has been suggested that the extreme despotic characteristics of the man did not emerge until after an attempt on his life in 1907.

Suicide of his children 

In 1910 both his wife, Desideria Ocampo, and his firstborn child, Diego Estrada, died of tuberculosis. Desideria Ocampo died in Nice, France after Estrada Cabrera sent her there for treatment. Diego had contracted a venereal disease while he was studying in the United States. The treatment of this, and his previous excesses led to tuberculosis;  unable to cope with it, he killed himself. On November 8, 1912, Francisco Estrada, who had just returned to Guatemala from Europe where he was learning agricultural technology in Paris, found himself in a 4000 dollar debt after courting a French lady older than himself. When Estrada Cabrera found out about this, he put the receipt under his son's dinner plate and waited for his reaction.  When Francisco came down for dinner, he saw the receipt and turned pale.  Without saying a word, he left the dining room and shot himself in his room.

Third presidential term

New military academy 

Estrada Cabrera established a military academy in the Army Artillery Fort in 1915. The building, constructed in 1907, suffered severe damage during the 1917–1918 earthquakes, and was not open again until the end of 1919.

Fourth presidential term

Social structure 

In 1920, prince Wilhelm of Sweden visited Guatemala and made a very objective description of both Guatemalan society and Estrada Cabrera government in his book Between two continents, notes from a journey in Central America, 1920. The prince explained the dynamics of Guatemalan society at the time pointing out that even though it called itself a "Republic", Guatemala had three sharply defined classes:

 Criollos: a minority comprised originally by ancient families descendants of the Spaniards that conquered Central America and that by 1920 comprised both political parties in the country.  By 1920, they were mixed to a large extent with foreigners and the great majority were of Indian descent. They led the country both politically and intellectually partly because their education, although poor by European standards of the time, was enormously superior to the rest of the people of the country, partly because only criollos were allowed in the main political parties and also because their families controlled and for the most part owned the cultivated parts of the country.
 Ladinos: middle class.  Formed of people born of the cross between natives, blacks and criollos. They held almost no political power in 1920 and comprised the bulk of artisans, storekeepers, tradesmen and minor officials. In the eastern part of the country they were usually agricultural laborers.
 Indians: the majority conformed by a mass of natives.  Slow of wit, uneducated and disinclined to all forms of change, they had furnished excellent soldiers for the Army and often rose, as soldiers, to positions of considerable trust given their disinclination for independent political activity and their inherent respect for government and officialdom. They made the main element in the working agricultural population.  There were three categories within them:
 "Mozos colonos": settled on the plantations. Were given a small piece of land to cultivate on their own account, in return for work in the plantations for  many months of the year.
 "Mozos jornaleros": day-laborers who were contracted to work for certain periods of time. They were paid a daily wage. In theory, each "mozo" was free to dispose of his labor as he or she pleased, but they were bound to the property by economical ties.  They could not leave until they had paid off their debt to the owner, and they were victim of those owners, who encouraged the "mozos" to get into debt beyond their power to free themselves by granting credit or lending cash.  If the mozos ran away, the owner could have them pursued and imprisoned by the authorities, with all the cost incurred in the process charged to the ever increasing debt of the mozo.  If one of them refused to work, he or she was put in prison on the spot. Finally, the wages were extremely low. The work was done by contract, but since every "mozo" starts with a large debt, the usual advance on engagement, they became servants to the owner.
 Independent tillers: living in the most remote provinces, survived by growing crops of maize, wheat or beans, sufficient to meet their own needs and leave a small margin for disposal in the market places of the towns and often carried their goods on their back for up to twenty five miles a day.

Country condition 

Prince Wilhelm also described how the country was after two decades of government of Estrada Cabrera.  Guatemala was naturally rich:
 On the Pacific coast one found sugar, coffee, spices and cocoa in great quantities; the plantations gave a splendid yield, and the productiveness of the soil in proportion to area was unique. 
 On the east coast, there were enormous banana plantations.
 And on the highlands, maize, wheat and corn were grown, and fine coffee grew as far up as 1600 m above sea level.
 Minerals such as gold, copper, tin and quicksilver were abundant but they were not exploited because the natives kept their whereabouts closely concealed.

But the means of communication were poorly developed; aside from the railway that ran from shore to shore going through Guatemala City and was run by the United Fruit Company, there were only paths and tracks, marked on the maps as highways, but in reality just narrow mule-roads.

Guatemala was placed in a tough spot, after the previous president known as Jose Maria Reyna Barrios (1854-1898) started to introduce a new type of paper currency. Due to the input of these new dollars known as the Guatemalan Quetzal, their value would slowly start to decrease in value, resulting in inflation within the economy. However, Jose Maria Barrios was assassinated before he was able to complete this transition between paper currencies. As a result, Manuel Estrada Cabrera inherited a country with a huge economic problem. Unfortunately, he was unable to succeed instantly, for to keep his government afloat, plus improve on the countries educational system. He had to temporarly increase again the production of the quetzal, thus increasing inflation. To solve this growing issue, Cabrera called for the assistance of the well-known economist, Edwin W. Kremmerer in 1919. Kremmerer was able to restructure Guatemala’s monetary system, plus give a few tips on how to better improve it, unfortunately, none of these were applied for Estrada was overthrown before they could be implemented. Fortunately, he succeeded in making education easily obtainable for some of the most rural parts of Guatemala. 

Besides being oppressed by brutal and dishonest officials and landowners, the natives were suffering of an endemic alcoholism problem. There were drinking places everything – as the government derived a certain revenue from the proceeds – with low quality spirits that had terrible effects. Both men and women got drunk regularly and changed their normally peaceful demeanor into an alcohol induced rage that results in mutilations and murder.

By the fourth term of Estrada Cabrera, despotism prevailed. Universal suffrage was the rule, but presidential elections were a farce as only the President himself was allowed to figure on the ballot papers and opposition was forbidden as any rival candidate was looked after by the police, and detained at best if not killed outright. Besides, anyone declining to vote was a suspect at once, and each plantation received a list of how many "mozos" are to vote in the elections.

The president's ministers were simply his advisors and the state revenues had made its way to the presidential pocket:  following the rule established by his predecessors managed to lay aside a fortune of 150 million, in spite of earning only US$1000 a year. The President chose the ministers from among his most faithful adherents, and they had no voice whatsoever in the final decision of affairs; and Congress was not much better, as no laws were ever passed without previous approval from the highest quarter. Finally, the courts of law were complete pledged to the presidential interests.

Throughout the entire administration prevailed rampant corruption. In the case of the president and ministers they procured additional revenues for themselves by granting concessions and the like; lower officials get money as they saw fit. All these issues were rarely known as everyone feared for their own life and keep silent.

Armed forces 

There was a universal conscription law, but almost any one could obtain exemption by payment and in reality only "mozos" were recruited.  If there was ever a need for additional recruits, they were gathered by force.  The pay of the army went only as far as the generals; the rank and file went about in rags and beg; proper uniform and army boots was non-existent with the soldiers going around barefoot. There was one general for each 100 men and they were the only ones that had dilapidated half boots.

The soldiers, like the general population, were uneducated as it was in the interest of the authorities to keep them as ignorant as possible in order that the masses might be more easily led.

1917–1918 earthquakes 

The seismic activity started on 17 November 1917 and ruined several settlements around Amatitlán. On December 25 and 29 of the same year, and on January 3 and 24 of the next, there were stronger earthquakes felt on the rest of the country, which destroyed a number of buildings and homes in both Guatemala City and Antigua Guatemala.

The Diario de Centro América, a semi-official newspaper owned in part by President Estrada Cabrera, spent more than two months issuing two numbers a day reporting on the damage, but after a while, started criticizing the central government after the slow and inefficient recovery efforts. In one of its articles, it went as far as to tell that some holy Jesus sculptures from the City had been saved because they had been taken away from their churches after the first earthquake as they "did not want to stay anymore in a city where excessive luxury, impunity and terror were rampant". Likewise, the newspaper complained that the National Assembly was issuing "excellent" laws, but nobody was "going by the law".  Finally, on its front page of May 1918, it complained that there was "still debris all over the city". The Diario de Centro América itself was print in the rubble, in spite of which it was able to issue its two daily numbers.

El Guatemalteco, the official newspaper, showed the impact of the disaster: its regular publication was interrupted from 22 December 1917 to 21 January 1918; when it reappeared, it was in a much smaller format.

Unionist Party and end of Cabrera's regime 

Opposition to his regime started after the 1917–1918 earthquakes as it was evident that the President was incapable of leading the recovery efforts.  Bishop of Facelli, Piñol y Batres from the Aycinena family, began preaching against the government policies in the San Francisco Church in 1919, instructed by his cousin, Manuel Cobos Batres. For the first time, the Catholic Church opposed the President. Additionally, Cobos Batres was able to inflame the nationality sentiment of conservative leaders José Azmitia, Tácito Molina, Eduardo Camacho, Julio Bianchi and  Emilio Escamilla into forming a Central America Unionist party and oppose the strong regime of Estrada Cabrera. The Unionist party began its activities with the support of several sectors of the Guatemala City society, among them the Universidad Estrada Cabrera students and the labor associations, who under the leadership of Silverio Ortiz founded the Patriotic Labor Committee.

The new party was called "Unionist", to differentiate it from both the Liberal and Conservative parties and therefore be able to appeal all "good willing, freedom and democracy loving" men who "dreamed of the Central America Union". The headquarters of the new party were in a house belonging to the Escamilla family which soon was known as "People's House". Tácito Molina wrote a founding Act for the party, which was signed by fifty one citizens on 25 December 1919 and was later known as the "Three-fold Act" because it had to be folded in three when it was distributed to the citizens of the city. The document was distributed in Guatemala City until January 1, 1920.

Estrada Cabrera was forced to accept the new party due to the internal and international pressure. On March 1, 1920, the National Assembly officially accepted the new party. Since then, Estrada Cabrera publicly admitted his willingness to accept the international opinion on opening spaces for political rivals, but kept arresting Unionist sympathizers. On 11 March 1920, the new party organized a large demonstration against the government, but the army fired against it causing a lot of resentment and anger and united the Guatemalan people against the President.

The National Assembly, whose president then was Adrián Vidaurre, former Secretary of War and one of the most important members of Cabrera's cabinet, declared the President unable to continue and designated Carlos Herrera y Luna as interim president. Cabrera resisted this designation and settled for a fight from his residence in "La Palma", until he was defeated in April, during the "Tragic Week" of April where Guatemala was in a state of revolution against the regime, and armed Unionists fought Cabrera's soldiers in the streets: 
  Estrada Cabrera finally surrendered on April 14, 1920 along with his only loyal friend, Peruvian poet José Santos Chocano.

Estrada Cabrera’s downfall had quite a unique conclusion without the involvement of the United States. Overall, American interests where no longer considering Estrada Cabrera as a suitable patron, especially American companies such as The United Fruit Company. It was unusual at the time to see The United States turn their back on Estrada Cabrera, for U.S. representation would usually act as a “kingmaker,” as put in the words of James R Handy.

It was believed that one of the few reasons that led to Estrada Cabrera not receiving any support from the U.S. was due to the lack of involvement during the First World War. The U.S. requested the Estrada Government to restrict a large German population found within Guatemala, which held several assets connected to coffee as explained by Ralph Lee Woodward. Cabrera did very little when it came down to seizing these German businesses and reselling them to the American assets. One of the only major German Businesses to eventually be seized was the Empresa Eléctrica del Sur, which was later sold to an American business was the called Henry W. Catlin’s Electric Lighting Company in 1885.

His loyal adherents until the end

Death 

Estrada Cabrera was sent to prison for life after he was deposed.  He died after a few years, in 1924, and was laid to rest in Quetzaltenango.

Legacy

Minerva celebrations 

Estrada's most curious legacy was his attempt to foster a cult of Minerva in Guatemala: Early in his reign he indicated interest in education and in 1899 he initiated feasts of Minerva, celebrating accomplishments of students and teachers based on an idea of his Secretary of Infrastructure, Rafael Spinola. Estrada Cabrera ordered the construction of a Hellenic style "Temples of Minerva" in Guatemala City, and a few years later all major cities of the country had their own, sponsored by the local tax payers. In the temples, Estrada Cabrera celebrated the "Fiestas Minervalias" for studious youth.

He extended roads, and the long-delayed railway from the Atlantic coast to Guatemala City was completed in 1908, although his achievements  were overshadowed by growing repression and blatant graft, including bribes for the president. The lot of native workers was little better than peonage, and everywhere there was surveillance to report subversive activities.

In fiction 
Estrada Cabrera was immortalized in the dictator novel El Señor Presidente (1946), written by Nobel laureate Miguel Ángel Asturias. Although the most famous, this is not the only book written about him: Rafael Arevalo Martinez wrote a book on his life, government and overthrow called Ecce Pericles, and Oscar Wyld Ospina wrote El Autócrata, a bitter biography of the president.

The role that UFCO played in Guatemala during the Estrada Cabrera and Jorge Ubico regimes is described in three novels from Miguel Ángel Asturias called The Banana Trilogy: Viento Fuerte, El Papa Verde, and Los Ojos de los Enterrados.

See also 

 Dictator novel
 History of Guatemala
 Presidents of Guatemala

Notes and references

References

Bibliography

External links 
 

 
Presidents of Guatemala
1857 births
1924 deaths
People from Quetzaltenango
Burials in Guatemala
19th-century Guatemalan people
20th-century Guatemalan people
Justice ministers of Guatemala
Interior ministers of Guatemala